Fa Mai is a 2004 Thai television series adapted from Suporn Bunnark's novel of the same title. Discussing events in the late reign of King Borommakot. Until the establishment of the Rattanakosin city of King Buddha Yodfa Chulalok the Great through the life of Or-saen, the protagonist of the story. He is friend of Khun Kon Yai (King Phra Buddha Yodfa Chulalok the Great), Khun Kon Klang (King Taksin the Great) and Khun Kon Lek (Maha Sura Singhanat), whose authors were inspired by the history of Chao Phraya Maha Sena (Bunnag), the beginning of the family. Khun Supon is a daughter-in-law of this family. directed by Jaroon Thammasin and starred Nattawut Sakidjai, Danuporn Punnakant, Atsadawut Luengsuntorn, Patcharapa Chaichua, Jiranan Manojam, Phudarith Prombandan, Chinmis Bunnag, Konggrapan Sengsuriya. It started airing on BBTV Channel 7 in Thailand on 9 June 2004.

Summary
The end of the reign of His Majesty King Borommakot of Ayutthaya Kingdom. When Saen was 8 years old, he retired to Luang Pichit Borathet. (or Luang Nai Sit), the father of Saen. Take Saen to present himself as a servant His Highness. and he was bestowed as a chamberlain of Somdej Phra Maha Uparaja Chaofa Thammathibet. he is adorable and greatly favored him. because he is the youngest servant They also look very good.

he is close to chamberlain, 3 senior men. Khun Kon Yai and Khun Kon Lek He is a brother from a family of nobles and rich, long-standing aristocrats, goddess of Wat Dusit and has a home in the area of Wat Suwandaram. The other one, Khun Kon Klang, is a sworn friend of Khun Kon Yai and Khun Kon Lek. Khun Klang is of Chinese descent and can speak Chinese. Yuan and Malay. This senior magistrate, only Khun Yai is the chief minister of Front Palace. Khun Lek and Khun Klang are the royal servants of the Royal palace. Later, when Ayutthaya was Fallen These four chamberlains have made great contributions in salvaging and building a new city into a "new horizon" for all Thai people.

Cast

Main cast
 Nattawut Sakidjai as Or-Saen
 Danuporn Punnakant as Chaofa Dok Madua
 Atsadawut Luengsuntorn as Chaofa Thammathibet Chaiyachet Suriyawong
 Patcharapa Chaichua as Renu-Nual
 Jiranan Manojam as Kara Bu-ning
 Thapakorn Ditsayanandana as Luang Pichit Borathet
 Phudarith Prombandan as Khun Kon Yai
 Chinmis Bunnag as Khun Kon Klang
 Konggrapan Sengsuriya as Khun Kon Lek
 Atima Thanaseniwat as Ploy-Waen
 Sattawat Dullayavijit as Chaofa Ekkathat
 Kajornsak Rattananitsai as King 
Maung Ywa
 Sombat Metanee as King Borommakot
 Bin Bunluerit as Muen Sri Sorrarakraj
 Ekapan Bunluerit as Phraya Rajmotri (Pin)
 Attachai Anantamek as Orkya Phra Phitsanulok
 Watcharakiet Boonpakdee as Phraya Phichai
 Adul Dulyarat as Saen's Grandfather
 Bussara Naruemit as Saen's Grandmother
 Virint Chei-Aroon as Glin Chant
 Nattarinee Kannasoot as Chao Chom Peng
 Wanyuda Saeng-U-dom as Chao Chom Man
 Suchuo Pongwilai as Maha Nawrahta
 Wanchai Paovibul as Phraya Rattana Thibet
 Piya Trakoonrat as Chamuen Wai Woranart
 Thanayong Wongtrakul as Prince Chit Sunthon
 Prab Yuttaphichai as Prince Sunthonthep
 Worapot Cha-em as Prince Sepphakdi 
 Porjet Kaenphet as Phraya Phonlathep
 Pipatphon Komarathat as Ne Myo Thihapate
 Wajira Permsuriya as Riam
 Sakan Ramputra as King 
Maung Lauk
 Surajit Bunyanont as Luang Pipat Gosa
 Nittaya Panatuek as Aunt os Renu Nuan
 Damp Datsakorn as Tong-In
 Vatchara Sittikul as Som-Kleang
 Utsaneeyaporn Polcharoen as Princess Nim
 Praparat Rattanathada as Prik
 Kriseeh Kaewvimol as Phraya Decho
 Sura Murathanont as Phraya Thainam
 Janthana Siripol as Krab's wife
 Tassanee Seedasamutra as Phraya Chakri's wife
 Umphon Suansuk as Meun Thip Sena
 Chaiya Sudjaidee as General Suki
 Phak Phattaraphong as Phraya Aphai Raja
 Duangdao Jarujinda as Qween Aphainuchit
 Pirojna Sangwaributr as Phraya Tani Sri Sultan
 Thaksin Bunphongsa as King Alaungpaya
 Karawut Pinthong as Mahadlek Hoom-Plae
 Thannamas Kwanmas as Chaofa Sangwan
 Piyada Penjinda as Qween of Ekkathat (Princess Meng-Mao)
 Yodchai Meksuwan as Phra Sri Suriya Phaha
 Virint Chei-Aroon as Phithak Thephamat
 Govitha Watanakul as Phra Chieng-Ngern
 Chalermporn Phumphanwong as Luang Gosa

Recurring cast
 Chalong Pakdeevijit as Maha Thiha Thura
 Seri Wangnaitham as Or-Grab
 Pakorn Pornphisut as Narenthon, Prince Surenthra Phithak

Production
Professor Dr. Suriya Rattanakul, the successor of Suporn Bunnag, gave an interview about the origin of this novel. The protagonist, Or-saen, was inspirated from the Bunnag family. There was a person named Sen. The character Renu Nuan was born from a woman who married Chao Khun Bunnag, named Chao Khun Nuan. She wrote 6 chapters of the novel and was published on May 19, 1967. It is a very popular novel. but still Did not write any more scripts. Until 1991 that during the summer semester, Professor Dr. Suriya found the outline of the rest of the poem. Therefore, it was published for the second time with the finished content. which received a very good response until it was made into a television drama in 2004. Based on the La Loubert archives It is an important document in the research and writing of the chapter with the historical evidence that has the most accepted content in the history. By telling stories from the reign of King Borommakot which was the most prosperous period in the late Ayutthaya period.

Sayom Sangvoributr has provided information that In the scene where the Buddha statue of Phra Si Sanphet had to be burned with gold A replica of the Si Sanphet Buddha statue has been built. by casting it out with wax and covering it with gold. in which the scene will be found while the Buddha image was burned gold has peeled into tears To convey the meaning of the loss during The 2nd Ayudhya fallen war

Rerun
On October 6, 2017, after the death of King Rama IX, Channel 7, has brought this drama back to broadcast. to mourn the death of His Highness with some scenes cut off.

References

External Links
 Official website Ch7HD

Thai historical television series
2004 Thai television series debuts
2004 Thai television series endings
Thai television soap operas
2000s Thai television series
Channel 7 (Thailand) original programming